The men's 300 m rifle three positions was a shooting sports event held as part of the Shooting at the 1956 Summer Olympics programme. It was the seventh appearance of the event at an Olympic Games. The competition was held on 1 December 1956, with 20 shooters from 14 nations competing. Nations had been limited to two shooters each since the 1952 Games. The event was won by Vasily Borisov of the Soviet Union, the nation's second consecutive victory in two appearances (tying Switzerland for most gold medals in the event). The Soviets finished 1–2, with Allan Erdman taking silver. Vilho Ylönen of Finland earned the bronze.

Background

This was the seventh appearance of the men's 300 metre three-positions rifle event, which was held 11 times between 1900 and 1972. Only one of the top 10 shooters from 1952 returned: fifth-place finisher Vilho Ylönen of Finland. Reigning gold medalist and 1954 world champion Anatoli Bogdanov opted to compete only in small-bore events in 1956. This left his countryman Vasily Borisov, the runner-up at the world championship, as the favorite.

The Republic of China, Pakistan, the Philippines, Romania, and South Korea each made their debut in the event. Denmark and Norway did not compete in the event for the first time; the Danes and Norwegians had competed in each of the first six appearances of the three-positions competition. Finland, Sweden, and the United States each made their sixth appearance, tied with Norway and Denmark for most appearances.

Competition format

The competition had each shooter fire 120 shots, 40 shots in each of three positions: prone, kneeling, and standing. Shots were fired in series of 10. The target was 1 metre in diameter, with 10 scoring rings; targets were set at a distance of 300 metres. Thus, the maximum score possible was 1200 points. Any rifle could be used.

Records

Prior to the competition, the existing world and Olympic records were as follows.

Vasily Borisov broke the Olympic record with 1138 points to win. All three medalists were above the old record. Borisov also set a world record in the prone position, with 396 points.

Schedule

All times are Australian Eastern Standard Time (UTC+10)

Results

References

Shooting at the 1956 Summer Olympics
Men's 300m 3 positions